Sarah Tyler may refer to:

Sarah Tyler (singer) who worked with Fred Falke
Sarah Tyler, character in 13Hrs
Srah Tyler, ship on The Truth About Spring